Olga Nikolayevna Yepifanova (born 19 August 1966) is a Russian politician who served as Deputy Chairman of the State Duma in 2016–2020. She has served as a deputy of the State Duma since 2011.

Early life 
Olga Nikolaevna Yepifanova was born on 19 August 1966 in Novgorod, Russian SFSR, Soviet Union.

References 

Living people
21st-century Russian politicians
Russian women in politics
A Just Russia politicians
1966 births
Sixth convocation members of the State Duma (Russian Federation)
Seventh convocation members of the State Duma (Russian Federation)
Members of the Federation Council of Russia (after 2000)
21st-century Russian women politicians